Lake Novozero (Ozero Novozero), is a lake in Belozersky District in Vologda Oblast, Russia. The lake has the island Ognenny Ostrov which now holds a high-security penal institution.

References

Novozero